Pat Irwin (born May 17, 1955) is an American composer and musician who was a founding member of two bands that grew out of New York City's No Wave scene in the late 1970s, the Raybeats and 8-Eyed Spy. He joined The B-52s from 1989 through 2008. He currently performs and records with SUSS who have released several records on the indie label Northern Spy.

He composed the score for the Showtime series, Dexter: New Blood. Other television scores include HBO's Bored to Death, Showtime's Nurse Jackie, and The Good Cop on Netflix. He has composed scores for many cartoons including Rocko's Modern Life, Pepper Ann, A Little Curious, and Class of 3000. Independent film credits include My New Gun, But I'm A Cheerleader, and Bam Bam and Celeste.

Biography
Pat Irwin graduated from Grinnell College in 1977. He received a Thomas J. Watson Fellowship for international study and moved to Paris after graduation. In Paris he attended composition workshops with John Cage. Moving to New York City in 1979 he was a founding member of
the no wave band 8-Eyed Spy which included Lydia Lunch and Jim Sclavunos, both members of Teenage Jesus and the Jerks and George Scott III from the Contortions. With Scott, he later formed the Raybeats with other former members of the Contortions: Jody Harris and Don Christensen.

8-Eyed Spy dissolved in 1980 after the death of George Scott. The band released Live on ROIR as a cassette only issue and a self-titled record on Fetish that was completed without Scott. Both Irwin and Scott contributed to Lydia Lunch's solo recording on ZE, Queen Of Siam. Scott was credited as Jack Ruby, a reference to his band before joining The Contortions.

The Raybeats continued to perform with Danny Amis on bass. They released two full-length albums, Guitar Beat, produced by Martin Rushent and recorded in 1981 at Rushent's newly built studio outside London. The Raybeats second LP, It's Only A Movie was recorded in New York City in 1983 and was produced by the band with Joe Blaney and mixed at Electric Lady Studios. In 2013 The Raybeats released The Lost Philip Glass Sessions on Orange Mountain Music, a collection of recordings that were started with Philip Glass in 1982 but were never completed.

Robert Palmer, writing in The New York Times, described Irwin as a "mercurial presence on the New York rock scene of the early 80's. The bands he helped found, the Raybeats and 8-Eyed Spy resembled each other only in that they had an aversion to the predictable and the ordinary."
 He began touring and recording with new wave rock band The B-52's in 1989, playing keyboards and guitar. His relationship with the band began when they borrowed Irwin's amplifier for their first gig in New York City in 1978. The band toured steadily through the 1990s and had two Top-Ten hits with "Love Shack" and "Roam". Recently, he has been performing and recording with the ambient-country group, SUSS.

Irwin composed the score for the Showtime series, Dexter: New Blood. He also composed the scores for HBO’s Bored To Death  and the Showtime series, Nurse Jackie. He composed the scores for many cartoons including Rocko’s Modern Life, Pepper Ann, A Little Curious, and the Emmy Award winning Class of 3000 (with André 3000 from the group, Outkast.) His contributions to the SpongeBob SquarePants soundtracks were given ASCAP Film and Television Music Awards in 2011, 2012, and 2013. The Cartoon Music Book referred to Irwin’s music as "astonishing musical cues that hold up with the best of Raymond Scott."

Irwin has performed in various venues throughout the world including CBGB, Max's Kansas City, Mudd Club, The Kitchen, Dance Theater Workshop, The Knitting Factory, Radio City Music Hall, Carnegie Hall and Madison Square Garden.

Irwin’s first feature film score was for My New Gun which was shown at the Cannes Film Festival in 1992. He has since composed the scores for many independent films including But I’m A Cheerleader, and Bam Bam and Celeste as well as several documentaries including Fall To Grace written and directed by Alexandra Pelosi for HBO Documentaries.

In 2012 Irwin received an honorary doctorate from Grinnell College. He currently teaches a seminar in film and television music at NYU's Tisch School of the Arts Graduate Musical Theatre Writing Program, as well a seminar in Scoring for Film and Television at the Feirstein Graduate School of Cinema at Brooklyn College.

Discography
See The Raybeats Discography
See The B-52's Discography
See 8-Eyed Spy Discography
2018: SUSS - Ghost Box
2019: SUSS - High Line
2019: Pat Irwin & J. Walter Hawkes - Wide Open Sky
2020: SUSS - Promise
2021: SUSS - Night Suite

Filmography (composer)
1987: The Day Of Five Billion (Documentary)
1987–88: Tales from the Darkside (TV)
1989: Without Borders (Documentary)
1990–96: Captain Planet and the Planeteers (TV, Theme)
1990: Nauru: The Island Planet (Documentary)
1992: Nova: An Astronaut's View Of Earth (Documentary)
1992: I Talk To Animals (Documentary)
1992: My New Gun
1993–96: Rocko's Modern Life (TV)
1995: Heading Home
1996: Loose Women
1996: Breathing Room
1996: Sudden Manhattan
1997: Colin Fitz Lives!
1997 Bear in the Big Blue House (episode) Why Bears Can't Fly?
1997–2000: Pepper Ann (TV)
1998: JetCat from KaBlam!
1998–99: A Little Curious (TV)
1999: Paramour (TV)
1999: Arresting Gena
1999: Suits
1999: 24 Hour Woman
1999: But I'm a Cheerleader
2000: Drop Back Ten
2000–02: A Little Curious (TV)
2002: The Groovenians (TV, Songs and Theme)
2003: Trekkies 2 (TV, Theme /w Fred Schneider)
2004: Personal Sergeant"
2005: Bam Bam and Celeste2005–08: My Gym Partner's a Monkey (TV, Theme co-writer)
2006–07: Class of 3000 (TV)
2008: The Accidental Advocate (Documentary)
2011: Stags2011: Bored to Death Season 3 (TV)
2012: Cherry Cottage (Documentary)
2012: Pervertigo2012: La Muse (short)
2013: Fall to Grace (Documentary)
2013–15: Nurse Jackie Season 5-7 (TV)
2019: Rocko's Modern Life: Static Cling2021: Dexter: New Blood''

References

External links

SUSS Website
SUSS Artist Page (Northern Spy Records)

1955 births
American film score composers
American rock guitarists
American male guitarists
Place of birth missing (living people)
American male saxophonists
Grinnell College alumni
Living people
20th-century American guitarists
21st-century American saxophonists
American male film score composers
20th-century American male musicians
21st-century American male musicians
Raybeats members
8 Eyed Spy members
The B-52's members